Leila Nazgül Seiitbek is a lawyer and human rights activist from Kyrgyzstan.

Education 
Leila completed her bachelor’s degree in law at the Kyrgyz State Law Academy. She is currently pursuing a higher degree in law at the University of Vienna, Austria.

Career 
Leila was a member and international advocacy manager of the Association for Human Rights in Central Asia from 2009 to 2020. She is currently the chairwoman and founder of Freedom for Eurasia.

Leila founded Blago, a public foundation, in 2012. She ran for parliamentary elections in October 2015, in the Onuguu-Progress party list When Leila worked to help Kyrgyz citizens track down vanished funds that were supposed to secure housing plots near Bishkek, she uncovered a corruption scheme that involved influential Kyrgyz officials. Because of her work as a human rights activist, she became the target of a smear campaign launched by Kyrgyz authorities and was forced to flee Kyrgyzstan.

Leila received asylum in Austria after facing politically motivated charges

Fabrication of criminal charges 
Leila regularly provided pro bono legal assistance in Kyrgyzstan. As part of this work, Leila consulted a Coalition of Citizens for Affordable housing who were defrauded by Kyrgyz officials. She shared her findings with investigative reporters at Kloop.kg. In 2015, along with Kloop.kg, she made public a series of facts about land frauds involving high-ranking officials from the then ruling party. Throughout 2015 and early 2016, Kyrgyz security services and police subjected Leila to harassment and intimidation. She was targeted in an aggressive smear campaign through government-controlled media outlets. On April 5, 2016, a news program named Leila and her husband "fraudsters”. As a result, Leila and her family were forced to leave Kyrgyzstan. Also in 2016, authorities initiated criminal cases against Leila and her husband under the Kyrgyzstan Criminal Code’s Articles 166 (“fraud”) and 171 (“appropriation and embezzlement of entrusted property”).

Women’s rights advocacy 
Leila is a women’s rights advocate. She focuses on gender discrimination and violence against women and girls in Central Asia.  Leila is a member of the Every Woman Coalition and a 1000 Voices Fellow. In 2022, she brought to light a case of intimate partner violence in Uzbekistan, in which a man hit his wife on the day of their wedding in front of guests.

Anti-corruption and anti-kleptocracy advocacy 
Leila works as an anti–corruption activist and addresses issues concerning post-Soviet kleptocracy and organized crime. She participates in a number of coalitions that work on these issues, including the Uzbek Asset Return Network, that tracks down assets received by members of corrupt Uzbek elites, Human Rights Impact Hub, a platform that provides complementary capacity-building, networking and knowledge-sharing tools on universal jurisdiction, targeted sanctions, and climate justice to equip lawyers with the necessary practical skills to engage in innovative litigation strategies run by International Partnership for Human Rights   and Global Initiative against Transnational Organized Crime (GI-TOC),  where she conducts research on Eurasia.

References 

Kyrgyzstani women's rights activists
Anti-corruption activists
Kyrgyzstani feminists